Tongogara High School is a government-run high school in the rural areas of Chief Nhema in Shurugwi, Zimbabwe which offers classes up to A-level.

As one of the many post-independence secondary schools to be built in Zimbabwe, it was named after a famous freedom fighter, Josiah Tongogara, as an honour to his exploits in the Rhodesian Bush War. The school is situated in the homeland of the former fighter. It is only 15 km from Chachacha business centre, 18 km from the iconic Chinogwenya village and the District Heroes Acre. The first A-level enrollment was in 1989. Boarding facilities were extended to the lower grades from 1990. There is also a continuing education program for those who would like to advance their education.

The school has produced notable graduates who have gone to make a different both at home and in Zimbabwean diaspora. This school is located in Mvura village. Students at this school usually go to Mvura Seventh Day Adventist church because it is nearer, and it is believed that almost everyone in Mvura Village is an Adventist. The church has been very supportive in grooming the students. Graduates from this school who have gone far: Burombo Mudhumo, Upenyu Mzimbani, Jotham Zvinongoza, Chamson Matanda, Mapingire, Dry Mativenga, Felix Mutasa, Tapiwa Dobo and Munyaradzi Dobo - the twins who are qualified chartered accountants, Comfort and Armstrong Mvura who are believed to have left the school for diaspora and have been supportive to all the residents in the village. The most respected teachers were Mr. Chikondo the headmaster, Mr. Madhina, Mrs. Bere, Mr. Musvavairi, Mrs. Musvavairi, Mr. Maharani, Mr. Sanudi, Mr. Shumba, Mr. Hlerema, Muhlahlo and Mr. Tandavara.

The first students to attend the school were 120 coming from Matamba Primary, Mavedzenge Primary and Tumba in 1982. The First Headmaster was Mr. W Chikumba assisted by Mr. Munhumeso, Mr Matongo and Mr Gombingo. Mr Chikumba was succeeded by Mr. C Magoma, Mr Makamure, Mr. Chikondo and Mrs. Musvavairi. The first O Level were of November 1985, and the first intake for A Level was in 1986. Tongogara was once headed by Amai Mangoma the headmistress.

On the 23rd of October 2019, there was a fire incident which reduced the boys hostel to ashes. The origins of the fire were unclear, it is believed that someone left his candle burning as there was no electricity due to load shedding. On the 24th of October 2019, Unki mine offered accommodation to all the boys in the boarding and also to transport them to school every morning until the hostel is completely restored.

References

High schools in Zimbabwe
Education in Midlands Province
Educational institutions established in 1982
1982 establishments in Zimbabwe